Acıgöl, formerly Dobada, is a town and district of Nevşehir Province in the Central Anatolia region of Turkey. According to 2010 census, population of the district is 15,040 of which 5,825 live in the town of Acıgöl, and the remainder in surrounding villages.
Acıgöl has 5 towns and 8 villages.

Topada rock inscription is located here.

Notes

References

External links

 District governor's official website 
 Map of Acıgöl district 
 District municipality's official website 
 Administrative map of Acıgöl district 

Towns in Turkey
Populated places in Nevşehir Province
Districts of Nevşehir Province